Vulcan LLC is a privately held company founded by the Microsoft co-founder Paul Allen and his sister Jody Allen in 1986 to establish and oversee the family's diverse business activities and philanthropic endeavors. It includes Vulcan Real Estate, the Paul G. Allen Estate and Trust, and advises the Paul G. Allen Family Foundation. Vulcan LLC is headquartered in Seattle, Washington.

History

Vulcan Northwest was formed in Bellevue, Washington in 1986 to manage the business affairs, investments, and philanthropic affairs of Paul Allen. The company initially had a Pacific Northwest focus.
The company's headquarters moved from Bellevue to Seattle in 1998. In 2001, they dropped "Northwest" from the company name to reflect growing global ventures.

In 2010, the Green Sports Alliance was conceived and founded by Vulcan Inc. and the Natural Resources Defense Council. Inaugural members and partners included Vulcan ventures such as the Seattle Seahawks, Portland Trail Blazers, and Seattle Sounders FC. Green Sports Alliance Members made a variety of commitments to improve their environmental performance such as reducing waste, conserving energy and water, and eliminating toxic chemicals.

Following Paul Allen's death in 2018, Vulcan co-executive Jody Allen—who also serves as the estate’s executor and trustee—has taken the lead strategic role at Vulcan.  This has included instigating a process to assess the various Vulcan projects and enterprises based on either profit or philanthropic impact.  Vulcan had approximately 700 employees as of mid-2019, and in October 2019 was reducing some of those positions.

Areas of focus

Vulcan Real Estate
Vulcan's Real Estate division offers development and portfolio management services from site selection and urban planning to build-to-suit construction. Vulcan has developed 6.6 million square feet of new residential, office, retail and biotechnology research space and has a total development capacity of 10,000,000 square feet (930,000 m2).

Vulcan Real Estate redeveloped the South Lake Union neighborhood north of downtown Seattle and along the south shore of Lake Union. More than $5.7 billion has been invested in the neighborhood since 2002 for development projects and public infrastructure improvements.

Vulcan advocated for the Seattle Streetcar line known as South Lake Union Streetcar, which runs from Seattle's Westlake Center to the south end of Lake Union. The streetcar officially started operation on December 12, 2007. This development has been criticized as a city-supported real estate investment for Vulcan Inc., and concerns over the loss of low-income housing have been expressed..

In 2012, The Wall Street Journal called Allen's South Lake Union investment "unexpectedly lucrative" and one that led to his firm selling a 1,800,000 square feet (170,000 m2) office complex to Amazon.com for US$1.16 billion, one of the most expensive office deals ever in Seattle. "It's exceeded my expectations," Mr. Allen said of the South Lake Union development. The company also developed a five-building complex for Google near Lake Union Park that is planned to open in stages between 2019 and 2022. In late February 2022, Vulcan Real Estate sold the two-block, four building Google campus overlooking Seattle’s Lake Union for $802 million, a price of $1,260 per square foot that’s believed to set a new record for the city’s office market.

In September 2014, Vulcan made a commitment to invest $200 million at Yesler Terrace where it would purchase three land parcels from the Seattle Housing Authority as part of an ambitious redevelopment plan for the 30-acre low-income housing site located southeast of downtown Seattle.

The Hospital Club 
In 2002, Paul Allen reopened the doors of the old St. Paul's Hospital in London's Covent Garden neighborhood, revealing a new 60,000-square-foot creative hub, providing a professional and social hub to those working in the film, television, music, advertising, contemporary art and design, publishing and journalism, interactive media, theatre and fashion industries.

Museums 

The Flying Heritage & Combat Armor Museum displays Paul G. Allen's collection of rare military aircraft, tanks and other military hardware from the United States, Germany, Japan, Russia, and the United Kingdom. The Collection opened to the public in 2004 at the Arlington, Washington airfield, moving in 2008 to a hangar at Paine Field in Everett, Washington. Several weeks after Allen's death in 2018, the museum opened a larger hangar to preserve related stories.
The Living Computers: Museum + Labs (LCM+L)  Is a computer and technology museum located in the SoDo neighborhood of Seattle, Washington. LCM+L (originally known as Living Computer Museum, and before that, PDPplanet.com) was founded by Paul Allen, on January 9, 2006.
The Museum of Pop Culture, or MoPOP (previously called EMP Museum, Is a nonprofit museum dedicated to contemporary popular culture. It was founded by Paul Allen in 2000 as the Experience Music Project. Since that time MoPOP has organized dozens of exhibits, 17 of which have toured across the US and internationally.
The Seattle Art Fair displays modern and contemporary art and is a showcase for the arts community of the Pacific Northwest.
The Seattle Cinerama is a downtown Seattle theater with a large screen. It was remodeled in 2014 to allow for more projection methods.
The Upstream Music Fest + Summit is a three-day music festival.

Vulcan Sports and Entertainment
Established in 2007, Vulcan Sports and Entertainment (VSE) provides strategic oversight for Allen's professional sports franchises including the Portland Trail Blazers, the Seattle Seahawks and manages Lumen Field, WaMu Theater, the Moda Center and Veterans Memorial Coliseum (Portland, Oregon). In the fall of 2018, Chris McGowan was named CEO of Vulcan Sports and Entertainment after Peter McLoughlin left the Seahawks.

Research

Both the Allen Institute for Brain Science and the Allen Institute for Artificial Intelligence were incubated at Vulcan Inc. 
Started at Vulcan Inc. in 2001, the Allen Brain Atlas project sought to understand the connections between genes and brain functioning. From the project's research, Paul Allen created the Allen Institute for Brain Science in 2003 with a $100 million donation.

Project Halo came next. The project ran from 2002 to 2013, with the goal of creating a "digital Aristotle" that can correctly answer queries about scientific information, using artificial intelligence. The project led to a number of spinoff technologies, including the wiki software bundle SMW+, the Semantic Inferencing on Large Knowledge (SILK) project and the Automated User-Centered Reasoning and Acquisition System (AURA). From Project Halo's results, the Allen Institute for Artificial Intelligence was created.

Vulcan Productions 
Vulcan Productions produces films, digital programs and outreach initiatives. Its programs have won awards including the George Foster Peabody Award, the Emmy Award, and the Grammy Award. Vulcan Productions closed in 2021.

Technology
Vulcan Inc. has also directly led some technology projects.

Vulcan Aerospace is a subsidiary of Vulcan Inc. set up in 2015 to help achieve Paul Allen's desire to make commercial space travel more convenient and less expensive. Vulcan Aerospace oversaw the development of Stratolaunch Systems project, an air launch system being developed 2010-2019 to transport payloads to low Earth orbit using a large carrier aircraft. In 2016, initial test flights were projected to take place as early as 2016.
In September 2016, Vulcan Aerospace President Chuck Beames left his role leading the effort and was replaced by an interim executive director: "Jean Floyd, the CEO of Vulcan’s Stratolaunch Systems."
Although the super-sized Stratolaunch carrier aircraft first flew on April 13, 2019, at the Mojave Air and Space Port in a 2 h 29 min flight,
Vulcan announced in May 2019 that the company would cease operations. 
Stratolaunch was sold and the new owner was identified in December 2019 to be Cerberus Capital Management. Stratolaunch continued to operate under new ownership.

In 2003, Vulcan began developing the Vulcan FlipStart, a subnotebook with a 5.6-inch screen. The company began to manufacture and sell the FlipStart in March 2007, and ceased production in May 2008.

Philanthropy 

In 2014, Vulcan Inc. partnered with Elephants Without Borders to secure a $7.3 million grant to conduct the Great Elephant Census. The census was designed to provide accurate and up-to-date data about the number and distribution of African elephants by using standardized aerial surveys of thousands of square miles. Prior to the survey, many countries had not conducted surveying flights in as many as 10 years. Dozens of researchers flying in small planes captured comprehensive observational data of elephants and elephant carcasses. The census was completed in 2016, finding that elephant populations had declined by as much as 30 percent over the previous seven years as a result of poaching.

In February 2016, Allen announced that Vulcan would donate $2 million in grants to stop the spread of the Zika virus. Most of the funds went to mosquito control efforts in countries where the virus was quickly spreading, while the remainder was used to fund a diagnostic test.

References

External links

Investment companies of the United States
Companies based in Seattle
American companies established in 1986
Privately held companies based in Washington (state)
Seattle Sounders FC
Portland Trail Blazers owners
1986 establishments in Washington (state)